Antonin-Gilbert Sertillanges, O.P. (16 November 1863 – 26 July 1948), was a French Catholic philosopher and spiritual writer.

Biography
Born Antonin-Dalmace, he took the name Antonin-Gilbert when he entered the Dominican order.  In 1893 he founded the Revue Thomiste and later became professor of moral philosophy at the Institut Catholique de Paris.  Henri Daniel-Rops wrote that it was rumored that President Raymond Poincaré asked Léon-Adolphe Cardinal Amette, Archbishop of Paris, for a reply to Pope Benedict XV's peace proposals, and that Amette passed the request along to Sertillanges; in any event, Amette gave his imprimatur to this reply on 5 December 1917, five days before it was made public.  In The Heroic Life, Sertillanges had defended Benedict's attitude toward peace, but in "The French Peace", Sertillanges said, "Most Holy Father, we cannot for an instant entertain your appeals for peace."

His scholarly work was concerned with the moral theory of Thomas Aquinas.  In the English-speaking world, he is best known for two non-specialist works. The Intellectual Life is a practical guide for how to structure one's life so as to make progress as a scholar. What Jesus Saw from the Cross is a spiritual work that drew upon the time Sertillanges spent living in Jerusalem. Certain of Sertillanges' works are concerned with political theory, with French identity and the structure of the traditional French family.

See also
 Thomism

Notes

Works
 (1899). L'Art et la Morale.
 (1903). Nos Luttes.
 (1904). La Politique Chrétienne.
 (1908). Agnosticisme ou Anthropomorphisme.
 (1908). L'Art et la morale.
 (1910). Saint Thomas d'Aquin (2 volumes).
 (1919). Paroles Françaises.
 (1921). La vie catholique (2 volumes).
 (1921). La Vie Intellectuelle, son Esprit, ses Conditions, ses Méthodes.
 (1921). L'Église (2 volumes).
 (1921) L'amour chrétien.
 (1928). Les Idées et les Jours: propos de Senex (2 volumes).
 (1930). L'Orateur Chrétien: Traité de Prédication.
 (1941). Hommes, mes Frères.
 (1939-1941) Le Christianisme et les Philosophies (2 volumes). 
 (1941-1942) Catéchisme des Incroyants (2 volumes).
 (1941). Blaise Pascal.
 (1941). Henri Bergson et le Catholicisme.
 (1941). Avec Henri Bergson.
 (1943). La Vie Française.
 (1944). La Philosophie de Claude Bernard.
 (1945). L'Idée de Création et ses Retentissements en Philosophie.
 (1946). Les Fins Humaines.
 (1946). La Philosophie des Lois.
 (1948). Le Problème du Mal (2 volumes).
 (1948-1949). Le Pensionnat de Godefroy-de-Bouillon de Clermont-Ferrand, 1849-1945. 
 (1962). La Philosophie Morale de Saint Thomas D'Aquin.
 (1963). De la Mort, Pensées Inédites de A.-D. Sertillanges. 
 (1965). Regards sur le Monde.
 (1965). L'Univers et l'Âme.

Reprints
by Sr Pascale-Dominique Nau, OP 
 L'Art et la morale, Rome, 2017.
 La vie catholique I & II, Rome, 2017.
 L'Église I & II, Rome, 2017.
 L'amour chrétien, Rome, 2017.

Articles 
 (1901). "La Morale Ancienne et la Morale Moderne," Revue Philosophique, 2, pp. 280–292.
 (1902-1903). "Les Bases de la Morale," Revue de Philosophie, pp. 1–23, 138–171, 305–333.
 (1908). "L'Idée Générale de la Connaissance dans saint Thomas d'Aquin," Revue des Sciences Philosophiques et Théologiques, 3, pp. 449–465.
 (1909). "La Providence, la Contingence et la Liberté selon saint Thomas d'Aquin," Revue des Sciences Philosophiques et Théologiques, 1, pp. 5–16.
 (1909). "La Contingence dans la Nature selon Saint Thomas d'Aquin," Revue des Sciences Philosophiques et Théologiques, 4, pp. 665–681.
 (1912). "La Sanction Morale dans la Philosophie de Saint Thomas," Revue des Sciences Philosophiques et Théologiques, 2, pp. 213–235.
 (1920). "L'Idée de Création," Annales de l'Institut Supérieur de Philosophie, 5, pp. 555–570.
 (1921). "La Science et les Sciences Spéculatives d'Après S. Thomas d'Aquin," Revue des Sciences Philosophiques et Théologiques, 1, pp. 5–20.
 (1928). "Note sur la Nature du Mouvement d'Après s. Thomas Aquin," Revue des Sciences Philosophiques et Théologiques, 2, p. 235-241.

Works in English translation
 (1908). Christ Among Men: or, Characteristics of Jesus, as Seen in the Gospel, London: R. & T. Washbourne.
 (1922). The Church, London: Burns, Oates & Washbourne. Reprinted by Cluny Media, 2020.
 (1931). Foundations of Thomistic Philosophy, London: Sands & Co. Reprinted by Templegate, 1956, and Cluny Media, 2020.
 (1933). Saint Thomas Aquinas and His Work, London: Burns, Oates & Washbourne. Reprinted by Blackfriars, 1957.
 (1948). The Intellectual Life: Its Spirit, Conditions, Methods, The Newman Press. Reprinted by the Catholic University of America Press, 1987.
 (1948). What Jesus Saw from the Cross, Dublin: Clonmore & Reynolds. Reprinted by the Sophia Institute Press, 1996.
 (1950). Recollection, McMullen Books.
 (1952). Kinships, McMullen Books.
 (1953). Rectitude, McMullen Books.
 (1954). Spirituality, McMullen Books.
 (1976). Jesus: He is the Unspeakable of Whom Men are Forever Speaking, Dimension Books.
 (1998). Walking with Jesus in the Holy Land, Sophia Institute Press.

References
 (1951). M. Pradines, Notice sur la Vie et les Œuvres du R. P. Antoine Sertillanges, Institut de France.
 (1957). F.-M. Moos, Le Père Sertillanges: Maître de Vie Spirituelle, La Pensée Catholique.

Further reading
 (1918). M. J. Lagrange, "The Catholic Church in Light of Two Recent Works," The Constructive Quarterly, Vol. VI, p. 1-24.

External links
 
 Works by Antonin Sertillanges, at Hathi Trust

1863 births
1948 deaths
French philosophers
Dominican scholars
Catholic philosophers
French male non-fiction writers